Latino mammarenavirus is a species of virus in the family Arenaviridae.  Its host is Calomys callosus, and it was isolated in Bolivia.

References

Arenaviridae